Mufti Muzammil Hussain Kapadia (born 1961 - 2021) was a Pakistani cleric, academic and deputy director and founding member of the Iqra Rozatul Atfal Trust.

Education 
He graduated from Jamia Uloom-ul-Islamia in 1981. He also obtained the certificate of Mufti by specializing in Islamic jurisprudence under the supervision of Wali Hasan Tonki. He has also studied for five years at Umm Al-Qura University, Makkah, on the subject of the principles of religion.

Death 
He died in February 2021. His funeral prayers were offered by his teacher Muhammad Rafiq at Jamia Uloom-ul-Islamia Banuri Town  in which thousands of scholars and students and people participated. Abdul Razzaq Iskander, Syed Sulaiman Yousuf Banuri, Anwar-ul-Haq Haqqani, Khalid Mahmood, Muhammad Hanif Jalandhari, Aziz-ur-Rehman Rahmani Maulana, Imdadullah Yousafzai,  Haq Nawaz and other scholars attended the funeral. He was buried in Mewa Shah Cemetery.

References 

1960 births
2021 deaths
Jamia Uloom-ul-Islamia alumni
Umm al-Qura University alumni
Pakistani Islamic religious leaders
People from Karachi
Deobandis